Castilleja lineariiloba ( C. lineariloba) is a species of Indian paintbrush known by the common name sagebrush Indian paintbrush that is endemic to the grasslands of the Sierra Nevada foothills in California.

Description
Castilleja lineariiloba is an annual herb growing up to about 45 centimeters tall. The leaves are up to about 7 centimeters long and covered in glandular hairs. The large inflorescence is made up of many greenish bracts tipped in white, yellow, or pale purple. Between the bracts are the pouched, lipped flowers, which may be white, yellow, or rose in color, and sometimes speckled with darker shades.

External links
Jepson Manual Treatment - Castilleja lineariiloba
Castilleja lineariiloba - Photo gallery

lineariiloba
Endemic flora of California
Flora of the Sierra Nevada (United States)
Natural history of the California chaparral and woodlands
Plants described in 1848
Flora without expected TNC conservation status